Hector Edward Arzeno (born September 30, 1947) is an Argentine-born American businessman, banker and politician.

Since January 4, 2023, he serves as a Democratic Party member of the Connecticut House of Representatives for the 151st District, which encompasses parts of Greenwich.

Early life and education 
Arzeno was born September 30, 1947, in Buenos Aires, Argentina. From 1967 to 1973, he studied Business Administration at the Pontifical Catholic University of Argentina, graduating with a licentiate degree which would be an equivalent of a Masters degree. In 1974, aged 27, he came to the United States for a trainee program at Morgan Guaranty Trust (today a part of JP Morgan Chase). He also completed an Advanced Management Program (AMP) at the Wharton School at the University of Pennsylvania in 1990. He settled in Greenwich, Connecticut in 1986, becoming a naturalized U.S. Citizen in 1987.

Early Career 
In 1987, he was deployed into an executive banking position at Banesto in Madrid, Spain, where he was responsible for Corporate and International banking. He moved back to the United States in 1990 becoming the general manager of the New York City branch of Banco Galicia, a position he continued to hold until 1997. Between 1997 to 2005 he moved back to Buenos Aires for an executive vice president position at Banco Galicia. In 2005, he co-founded Fenix Bursatil S.A., a finance holding based in Buenos Aires, Argentina. Since 2012, he has been active as independent financial advisor. He served as a volunteer coach for the Greenwich Youth Soccer League, member of the parent board of Bucknell University, member of the sustainability board of Greenwich Country Day School, a Greenwich High School tour guide and science department helper as well as a volunteer for the Town of Greenwich Conservation Department.

Greenwich RTM 
Since 2019, Arzeno served on the Town Representative Meeting (RTM) for District 8, serving as a delegate on the Finance Committee and alternate on the Claims Committee.

Connecticut State House of Representatives

Elections

2022 
In 2020, Arzeno ran for election to the Connecticut House of Representatives, but was defeated by Republican Harry Arora. He became member-elect in the 2022 election, defeating contrary Peter Sherr (CT-R), assuming office on January 4, 2023. He was the first town Democrat to assume the seat in history.

Electoral History

Personal Life 
Arzeno is married to Paula (née Picco). They have five children between them, four daughters and a son. He resides in the Cos Cob section of Greenwich.

He is a dual citizen of the United States and Argentina.

External links 

 Hector Arzeno on Ballotpedia 
 Personal Website of Hector Arzeno

References 

1947 births
Living people
Democratic Party members of the Connecticut House of Representatives
American people of Argentine descent